Anna Brita Wendelius, née Ramklou (1741–1804), also known as Wendelia, was a Swedish artist and singer. She was a member of the Royal Swedish Academy of Music and the Utile Dulci.

Anna Brita Wendelius was married to a wealthy merchant, Anders Wendelius. She was known as a non professional musician and singer, and was also a published poet. She was one of only three females known to have been a member of the Utile Dulci, the other being Anna Charlotta von Stapelmohr and Anna Maria Lenngren. In 1777, it is mentioned that she performed at one of the ceremonies of the Utile Dulci with her own written recitative and aria. In 1795, she was elected as a member into the Swedish Royal Academy of Music, together with Margareta Alströmer and Christina Fredenheim.

References

Bibliography
 Anna Ivarsdotter Johnsson och Leif Jonsson: "Musiken i Sverige. Frihetstiden och Gustaviansk tid 1720-1810 (The Music of Sweden. The age of Liberty and the Gustavian age 1720-1810."
 Ann Öhrberg: Fasa för all flärd, konstlan och förställning” Den ideala retorn inom 1700-talets nya offentlighet. Samlaren. 2010

1741 births
Members of the Royal Swedish Academy of Music
1804 deaths
Swedish women singers
18th-century Swedish singers
18th-century Swedish women artists
18th-century Swedish women writers
Swedish women poets
18th-century Swedish poets
Gustavian era people
18th-century Swedish artists